Bajra Sandhi Monument is a monument to the struggles of the Balinese people throughout history. The monument is located in front of the Bali Governor's Office in Denpasar, Indonesia, on the island of Bali.
The monument was built in 1987, inaugurated by president Megawati Sukarnoputri on June 14, 2003.

Structure
The monument is a rectangular shape, and follows the architectural principles of the "Tri Mandala." It consists of three parts:
 Utama Mandala, the main building in the center of the monument
 Madya Mandala, the inner courtyard surrounding the Utama Mandala
 Nista Mandala, the outer courtyard surrounding the Madya Mandala

The main building, the Utama Mandala, has three floors. The ground floor, Nistaning Utama Mandala, contains administrative rooms, a library, and exhibition halls. In the center of the ground floor is a lake called the Puser Tasik. The first floor, Madyaning Utama Mandala, contains 33 dioramas, similar to those in the National Monument in Jakarta, but with a focus on the struggles of the Balinese people. The dioramas cover various incidents in the history of the Balinese, including the Balinese kingdom, the introduction of Hinduism, the Majapahit era, Dutch colonialism, and the struggle for independence. The second floor is a meditative space which provides a panoramic view of Denpasar.

History 
The monument was originally built in 1987 and opened to the public in 2004. It stands to represent a long history of struggle of the Balinese people, namely the invasion of the Dutch in 1906 and 1908. The invasions saw the deaths of over 1,000 Balinese people, many of whom were civilians, including the Balinese rulers of Badung and Tabanan. These were some of the 6 Dutch involvements in Bali, being the most recent and catastrophic in its statistical proportions. The statue now represents the struggle surrounding Dutch colonialism, which was criticized down the line for its policies especially in the eastern islands, along with religious historical references predating Dutch colonialism such as the introduction of Hinduism.

In popular culture 
The monument was the 10th pit stop of The Amazing Race 28 and the Finish Line of The Amazing Race Asia 5.

References

Monuments and memorials in Indonesia
Denpasar
Tourist attractions in Bali
Buildings and structures in Bali